Kibler is a surname. Notable people with the surname include:

 Drew Kibler (born 2000), American swimmer
 John Kibler (1928–2010), American baseball umpire
 Brian Kibler (born 1980), American game designer
 Tom Kibler (1886–1971), American baseball player, coach, athletics administrator, and baseball executive